James Champlin "Champ" Osteen (February 24, 1877 – December 14, 1962) was a professional baseball player. He played all or part of four seasons in Major League Baseball for the Washington Senators, New York Highlanders and the St. Louis Cardinals in 1903, 1904, 1908 and 1909, primarily as a shortstop. He batted left and threw right-handed.  In 83 career games, he had 60 hits in 304 at bats.

Osteen was born in Hendersonville, North Carolina and attended Erskine College. He died in Greenville, South Carolina.

References

External links

1877 births
1962 deaths
Major League Baseball shortstops
New York Highlanders players
St. Louis Cardinals players
Washington Senators (1901–1960) players
Birmingham Barons players
Shreveport Giants players
Davenport River Rats players
Norwich Reds players
Atlanta Crackers players
Springfield Babes (baseball) players
Erskine Flying Fleet baseball players
Furman Paladins baseball coaches
Indianapolis Indians players
Fort Wayne Billikens players
Montgomery Climbers players
Dallas Giants players
Austin Senators players
Montgomery Billikens players
Mobile Sea Gulls players
Charlotte Hornets (baseball) players
Asheville Mountaineers players
Durham Bulls players
Columbia Comers players
People from Hendersonville, North Carolina
Baseball players from North Carolina